Jan Karafiát may refer to:

 Jan Karafiát (author) (1846–1929), Czech clergyman and author
 Jan Karafiát (gymnast), Czechoslovakian gymnast